West Kentucky Community and Technical College (WKCTC) is a public community college in Paducah, Kentucky. It is part of the Kentucky Community and Technical College System (KCTCS) and was formed by the 2003 consolidation of Paducah Community College and West Kentucky Technical College. WKCTC is accredited by the Southern Association of Colleges and Schools, Commission on Colleges (SACSCOC).

History
Paducah Community College was founded in 1932 as a private school called Paducah Junior College (PJC). PJC became a municipal college in 1936. In 1964, PJC moved to a new campus on Alben Barkley Drive in Paducah which serves as today's WKCTC campus. In 1967, PJC joined the University of Kentucky's Community College System, now )the Kentucky Community and Technical College System (KCTCS), and became Paducah Community College. (PCC)

West Kentucky Technical College was founded in 1909 as West Kentucky Industrial College, a teacher training school for African American students. West Kentucky Industrial College became a state-supported junior college in 1918. The college changed its name twice more, eventually becoming West Kentucky State Vocational-Technical School. In 1979, the school moved from its home on H.C. Mathis Drive to a new campus adjacent to PCC.

In 1998, PCC and West Kentucky TECH (yet another name for the vocational-technical school) joined the newly formed KCTCS. At that time, West Kentucky TECH became West Kentucky Technical College. That same year, the University of Kentucky opened a branch campus of its College of Engineering at the PCC campus. PCC and West Kentucky Technical College consolidated in 2003 to become West Kentucky Community and Technical College (WKCTC).

In 2020, WKCTC was again named one of the top ten community colleges in the nation by the Aspen Institute and eligible to compete for a $1 million prize. It was the fifth time the college received this recognition.

Student population 
Fifty-seven percent of WKCTC's attendees are full-time students, while 43% attend the college on a part-time basis. Almost two-thirds of the student population is female. Dual credit students, composed of high school students earning college credit, compose 20% of the student body. Seventy-eight percent of students receive financial aid.

In the 2022–2023 academic year WKCTC Fall enrollment increased by 9% from the previous year. Over 46% of WKCTC graduates are male. Only 14% of WKCTC graduates are from a minority race.

On average, WKCTC graduates earn a salary of $24,085 three years after graduation. Median salaries three years after graduation are lowest for social and behavioral science majors at $14,106. However, median salaries three years after graduation are highest for STEM majors at $27,183.

Full-time enrollment for the 2018–2019 academic year decreased by 2.1 percent from the 2017–2018 academic year.  WKCTC enrollment makes up 7% of the Kentucky Community and Technical College System.

Service area
The primary service area for WKCTC includes all eight counties in the Purchase area:

Ballard County
Calloway County
Carlisle County
Fulton County
Graves County
Hickman County
Marshall County
McCracken County

It also includes two counties that border on the Purchase area:
Livingston County
Lyon County

As a regional institution, the college also serves students from southern Illinois, Missouri and northwest Tennessee.

Notable alumni
 Julian Carroll, first Kentucky Governor from far western Kentucky and Kentucky Senator
 Daniel Hurt, media personality and host of talk show River City Presents with Daniel Hurt
 Bob Leeper, Kentucky Senator (1991–2015)
 Jeff McWaters, former member of the Senate of Virginia and founder and former CEO of Amerigroup
 Steven Rudy, Kentucky politician and agribusiness owner
 Roy Skinner, college basketball coach who helped break the racial barrier by recruiting Perry Wallace, the first African American athlete to play varsity basketball for a team in the Southeastern Conference

References

External links
Official website

Buildings and structures in Paducah, Kentucky
Kentucky Community and Technical College System
Educational institutions established in 2003
Universities and colleges accredited by the Southern Association of Colleges and Schools
Education in McCracken County, Kentucky
2003 establishments in Kentucky